The Turks in Europe  (sometimes called Euro-Turks;  or Avrupa'da Yaşayan Türkler or Avrupa Türkleri) refers to ethnic Turks living in Europe. Generally, the Euro-Turks refers to the large Turkish diasporas living in Central and Western Europe as well as the historic Turkish minorities living in the Balkans since Ottoman rule, and the Turks living in Russia and other European Post-Soviet states. When the term "Euro-Turks" is taken in its most literal sense, Turkish people living in the European portion of Turkey are also included in the term. Even more broadly, the Turkish Cypriot community for centuries old native people living in Cyprus (which is located entirely in Asia) have also been defined under the term "Euro-Turks" since the island joined the European Union. 

Turks have had a long history in Europe dating back to the Ottoman era when they began to conquer and migrate to Eastern Europe during the Ottoman conquests (see the Ottoman territories in Europe) which, other than Turkey, created significant Turkish communities in Bulgaria (Bulgarian Turks), Bosnia and Herzegovina (Bosnian Turks), Cyprus (Turkish Cypriots), Georgia (Meskhetian Turks), Greece (Cretan Turks, Dodecanese Turks, and Western Thrace Turks), Kosovo (Kosovan Turks), Serbia (Turks in Serbia), North Macedonia (Turks in North Macedonia), and Romania (Romanian Turks). 

In the first half of the 20th century, immigration of Turks to Western Europe began with Turkish Cypriots migrating to the United Kingdom in the early 1910s when the British Empire annexed Cyprus in 1914 and the residents of Cyprus became British subjects. However, Turkish Cypriot migration increased significantly in the 1940s and 1950s, due to the Cyprus conflict. Similarly, Turkish Algerians and Turkish Tunisians mainly emigrated to France after Algeria and Tunisia came under French colonial rule. Conversely, in 1944, Turks who were forcefully deported from Meskheti in Georgia during the Second World War, known as the Turkish Meskhetians, settled in other parts of the Soviet Union, especially in Azerbaijan, Kazakhstan, Russia, and the Ukraine. 

In the second half of the 20th century, Turkish migration from Turkey to Western and Northern Europe increased significantly when in 1961 Turkish "Gastarbeiter" began to arrive under a "Labour Export Agreement" with West Germany, followed in 1964 by similar agreements with the Netherlands, Belgium, and Austria; France in 1965; and Sweden in 1967. Furthermore, many Balkan Turks also arrived in these countries under similar labour agreements, thus, since the 1960s there has also been a substantial Turkish Macedonian community in Sweden; Turkish Bulgarian and Turkish Western Thracian communities in Germany, etc. 

More recently, in the 21st century, Turkish Bulgarians, Turkish Cypriots, Turkish Western Thracians, and Turkish Romanians have used their right as EU nationals to migrate throughout Western Europe. Furthermore, Iraqi Turks and Syrian Turks have come to Europe mostly as refugees since the Iraq and Syrian civil war – especially since the European migrant crisis.

History

Ottoman migration 

During the rule of the Ottoman Empire (1299–1923), Turkish settlers began to move into the Ottoman territories in Europe as part of the Turkish expansion, because these Turkish communities migrated to these countries during the Ottoman rule, they are not considered part of the modern Turkish diaspora. However, these populations, which have different nationalities, still share the same ethnic, linguistic, cultural and religious origins as today's Turkish nationals.

Balkan Turks
The conquest of the Balkans by the Ottomans set in motion important population movements of Turks brought over from Anatolia and Asia Minor to Rumelia, establishing a firm Turkish base for further conquests in Europe. Thus, the Ottomans used colonization as a very effective method to consolidate their position and power in the Balkans. The colonizers that were brought to the Balkans consisted of soldiers, nomads, farmers, artisans and merchants, dervishes, preachers and other religious functionaries, and administrative personnel. Densely populated Turkish colonies were established in the frontier regions of Thrace, the Maritsa and the Tundzha valleys. In addition to voluntary migrations, throughout the fourteenth, fifteenth, and sixteenth centuries, the Ottoman authorities also used mass deportations ("sürgün") as a method of control over potentially rebellious individuals. One of the greatest impacts of the Ottoman colonization process of the Balkans was felt in the urban centres, many towns became major centres for Turkish control and administration, with most Christians gradually withdrawing to the mountains. The Ottomans embarked on creating new towns and repopulating older towns that had suffered significant population decline and economic dislocation during the wars preceding the Ottoman conquests. Major Balkan towns, especially those on or near transportation and communication routes, were the focal point of Ottoman colonization in the Balkans. Most urban centres in the Balkans, especially in Thrace, Macedonia, Thessaly, and Moesia, achieved Muslim/Turkish majorities or substantial minorities soon after the completion of the conquest and remained overwhelmingly Muslim in composition into the eighteenth century, and in some areas such as Macedonia and Bulgaria well into the nineteenth century. However, in the course of the nineteenth and twentieth centuries, many Turks were displaced, ethnically cleansed, most of them fleeing to Anatolia and East Thrace. At present, there are still significant Turkish minorities living in Bulgaria, the province of East Macedonia and Thrace in Northern Greece, Kosovo, North Macedonia, and Romania.

Meskhetian Turks

The Meskhetian Turks, also known as Ahiska Turks, are group of Turks who reside, or used to reside, in Meskheti which is in the southwestern region of Georgia. The region came under Ottoman rule in the sixteenth century up until 1829. Today, approximately 600 to 1,000 Meskhetian Turks are still living in Georgia, the population drastically decreased in 1944 when Joseph Stalin deported approximately 100,000 of these Turks to Eastern Europe and Central Asia.

Turkish Cypriots

The Ottoman Turks conquered Cyprus in 1571 when they began a campaign which led to the fall of Nicosia in September 1570 and of Famagusta in August 1571. By 1571, about 30,000 Turkish settlers, which included soldiers who were involved in the conquest and their families, or agricultural colonizers, particularly from the Konya region, were given land on the island. Additionally, many of the islanders converted to Islam during the early years of Ottoman rule due to significant advantages to being Muslim (i.e. taxation). Thus, a strong Turkish element was formed in Cyprus' population, which was later reinforced by immigration from Asia Minor.

Turkish Roma

With the expansion of the Ottoman Empire, Turkish speaking  Muslim Roma settled in Rumelia (southeastern Europe) under Ottoman rule. The Ottoman Archives of the 18th century and 19th century told from so-called Türkmen Kıpti, who speak Turkish only with few Romani words in there jargon, as a separate group of other Roma people in Rumelia.
Turkish Roma have adopted the Turkish language over century and abandoned the Romani language in order to establish a Turkish identity to become more recognized by the Host population. The majority Turkish speaking Muslim Roma in Bulgaria, Dobruja-Romania, Western Thrace-Greece, Northern Cyprus and of course in Turkey declare themselves to be Turks instead of Romani people. Gene flow from the Ottoman Turks spilled over in the Balkan Roma and established a higher frequency of the Y-haplogroups J and E3b The Greek Doctor A. G. Paspati made also the statemant in his Book, that Turks married often Roma Woman. Horahane means Turks (term for Muslims) in Romani language. Some Turkish Citizens who came as Gastarbeiter from Turkey to Europe, have Romani Background and are fully assimilated in the Turkish European Community. The second wave of Turkish Roma to West Europe started, when Bulgaria and Romania became a member of the EU; Many Turkish Roma from Bulgaria and Romania (Dobruja) went to West Europe.

Early Western European Turks as traders in Western Europe
At least from the 16th century onwards Ottoman traders settled in western European trading capitals such as Antwerp, Amsterdam  and London. Turkish traders in the Netherlands had at least two mosques in Amsterdam in the early 17th century.

Modern migration 

According to an estimate in the European Union there are 3,7 million ethnic Turks.

Turkish Cypriot migration to Great Britain (1920s-present)

Turkish Cypriots started to immigrate from Cyprus to the United Kingdom in the early 1910s when the British Empire annexed Cyprus in 1914 and the residents of Cyprus became subjects of the Crown. Many Turkish Cypriots went to the United Kingdom as students and tourists whilst others left the island due to the harsh economic and political life during the British Colony of Cyprus. Emigration to the United Kingdom continued to increase when the Great Depression of 1929 brought economic depression to Cyprus, with unemployment and low wages being a significant issue. During the Second World War, the number of Turkish run businesses increased which created a demand for more Turkish Cypriot workers. Thus, throughout the 1950s, Turkish Cypriots emigrated to the United Kingdom for economic reasons and by 1958 the number of Turkish Cypriots was estimated to be 8,500. Their numbers increased each year as rumours about immigration restrictions appeared in much of the Cypriot media.

Furthermore, the 1950s saw the arrival of many more Turkish Cypriots to the United Kingdom who felt vulnerable as they had cause for concern about the political future of the island. This was first evident when the Greek Cypriots held a referendum in 1950 in which 95.7% of eligible Greek Cypriot voters cast their ballots in supporting a fight aimed at uniting Cyprus with Greece. Hence, Turkish Cypriots fled to the United Kingdom due to the EOKA terrorists and its aim of Enosis. By the 1960s, inter-ethnic fighting broke out and by 1964 some 25,000 Turkish Cypriots became internally displaced, accounting to about a fifth of their population; furthermore, approximately 60,000 Turkish Cypriots were forcefully moved into Turkish Cypriot enclaves within Cyprus. This period in Cypriot history resulted in an exodus of more Turkish Cypriots to the United Kingdom. Other reasons for the continued migration to the United Kingdom was because of the economic gap which was widening in Cyprus. The Greek Cypriots were increasingly taking control of the country's major institutions causing the Turkish Cypriots to become economically disadvantaged. Thus, the political and economic unrest in Cyprus after 1964 sharply increased the number of Turkish Cypriot immigrants to the United Kingdom. Many of these early migrants worked in the clothing industry in London, where both men and women could work together- sewing was a skill which the community had already acquired in Cyprus. Turkish Cypriots were concentrated mainly in the north-east of London and specialised in the heavy-wear sector, such as coats and tailored garments. This sector offered work opportunities where poor knowledge of the English language was not a problem and where self-employment was a possibility.

Once the Greek military junta rose to power in 1967, Greece staged a coup d'état in 1974 against the Cypriot President, with the help of EOKA B, to unite the island with Greece. This led to a military offensive by Turkey who invaded the island. By 1983, the Turkish Cypriots declared their own state, the Turkish Republic of Northern Cyprus (TRNC), which has since remained internationally unrecognised except by Turkey. The division of the island led to an economic embargo against the Turkish Cypriots by the Greek Cypriot controlled Government of Cyprus. This had the effect of depriving the Turkish Cypriots of foreign investment, aid and export markets; thus, it caused the Turkish Cypriot economy to remain stagnant and undeveloped. Due to these economic and political issues, an estimated 130,000 Turkish Cypriots have emigrated from Northern Cyprus since its establishment to the United Kingdom. In 2011, the House of Commons, Home Affairs Committee suggested that there are now about 300,000 Turkish Cypriots living in the UK.

Turkish Meskhetian migration within Eastern Europe (1944–present)

The Meskhetian Turks, originally living in Meskheti (now known as Samtskhe-Javakheti) which is a part of southern Georgia, are widely dispersed throughout the former Soviet Union (150,000 live in Kazakhstan, 90,000–110,000 in Azerbaijan, 70,000–90,000 in Russia, 50,000 in Kyrgyzstan, 15,000 in Uzbekistan and 10,000 in Ukraine) as a result of forced deportations and discrimination which began in 1944. During World War II, the Soviet Union was preparing to launch a pressure campaign against Turkey and Vyacheslav Molotov, then Minister of Foreign Affairs, formally presented a demand to the Turkish Ambassador in Moscow for the surrender of three Anatolian provinces (Kars, Ardahan and Artvin); thus, war against Turkey seemed possible, and Joseph Stalin wanted to clear the strategic Turkish population (especially those situated in Meskheti) located near the Turkish-Georgian border which were likely to be hostile to Soviet intentions.

In 1944, the Meskhetian Turks were forcefully deported from Meskheti in Georgia and accused of smuggling, banditry and espionage in collaboration with their kin across the Turkish border. Nationalistic policies at the time encouraged the slogan: "Georgia for Georgians" and that the Meskhetian Turks should be sent to Turkey "where they belong". Joseph Stalin deported the Meskhetian Turks to Central Asia (especially to Uzbekistan and Kazakhstan), thousands dying en route in cattle-trucks, and were not permitted by the Georgian government of Zviad Gamsakhurdia to return to their homeland.

In the late 1970s, the Stavropol and Krasnodar authorities in Russia visited various regions of Uzbekistan to invite and recruit Meskhetian Turks to work in agriculture enterprises in southern Russia. By 1985, Moscow issued a proposal inviting more Meskhetian Turks to move to villages in southern Russia that had been abandoned by ethnic Russians who were moving to the cities. However, the Meskhetian Turks response was that they would only leave Uzbekistan if the move were to be to their homeland. Then, in 1989, ethnic Uzbeks began a series of actions against the Turks, they became the victims of riots in the Ferghana valley which led to over a hundred deaths. Within days, Decision 503 was announced "inviting" the Turks to occupy the empty farms in southern Russia that they had resisted moving to for years and around 17,000 Meskhetian Turks were evacuated to Russia. Meskhetian Turks maintain that Moscow had planned the Uzbek riots. By the early 1990s, of the 70,000 Meskhetian Turks who were still resident in Uzbekistan, approximately 50,000 Turkish Meskhetian refugees went to Azerbaijan due to continued discrimination whilst others went to Russia and Ukraine due to fears of continued violence.

Mainland Turkish migration to Western and Northern Europe (1960s-present)

The "gastarbeiters" (guest workers)

The concept of the Gastarbeiter involved the agreements between the host country and Turkey which was bound up with policies of the governments involved, with state bureaucracies on both sides ultimately responsible for the dispatch and settlement of the workers. Subsequently, labor agreements were signed with several European countries- with Germany in 1961; with Austria, Belgium, and the Netherlands in 1964; with France in 1965; and with Sweden in 1967. The agreements were based on a principle of rotation, and a worker was expected to return home after a year of employment abroad. However, employers wanted to retain workers who had become accustomed to the work; therefore, the rotation principle never became practice. Workers were not permitted to take their families abroad with them, and were housed in group living quarters or dormitories known as "Heim".

Family reunifications
By the early 1970s, the majority of Turkish emigration to Western Europe was for the purpose of family reunification. Furthermore, by the 1990s, migration mainly by way of marriage continued to be one of the principal reasons for settling in Western Europe.

Migration of Western Thrace Turks to Western Europe (1960s-present)

About 25,000 to 40,000 Turks of Western Thrace, who are the ethnic Turks who live in the north-eastern part of Greece, have emigrated to Western Europe. Between 12,000 and 25,000 moved to Germany in the 1960s and 1970s, when the Thracian tobacco industry was affected by a severe crisis and many tobacco growers lost their income. After Germany, the Netherlands is the most popular destination for Western Thrace Turks, especially in the region of Randstad. There is also an estimated 600–700 Western Thrace Turks living in London, although the total number living outside London is unknown.

Migration of Bulgarian Turks to Western Europe (2000s-present)

According to the National Statistical Institute of Bulgaria, Bulgarian Turks make up 12% of short term migrants, 13% of long term migrants, and 12% of the labour migrants. However, it is unlikely that this generalisation shows a true indication of the ethnic make-up of Bulgarian citizens living abroad because Bulgarian citizens of Turkish origin make up entire majorities in some countries. For example, out of the 10,000 to 30,000 people from Bulgaria living in the Netherlands, the majority, of about 80%, are ethnic Turks from Bulgaria who have come from the south-eastern Bulgarian district of Kurdzhali. Moreover, the Bulgarian Turks are the fastest-growing group of immigrants in the Netherlands. There is also about 30,000 Bulgarian Turks living in Sweden, a growing community in the United Kingdom and Germany, and 1,000 in Austria.

Population

In the post-Ottoman countries, Turkish Cypriots (alongside recent Anatolian settlers) form a majority in Northern Cyprus; furthermore, in the Balkans, the Turks are the second largest ethnic group in Bulgaria, and the third largest ethnic group in North Macedonia. In the diaspora (i.e. outside the former territories of the Ottoman Empire), the Turkish people form the second largest ethnic group in Austria, Denmark, Germany and the Netherlands. 

As early as 1997 Professor Servet Bayram and Professor Barbara Seels said that there was 10 million Turks living in Western Europe and the Balkans (excluding Cyprus and Turkey). By 2010, Boris Kharkovsky from the Center for Ethnic and Political Science Studies said that there was up to 15 million Turks living in the European Union. According to Dr Araks Pashayan 10 million "Euro-Turks" alone were living in Germany, France, the Netherlands and Belgium in 2012. Yet, there are also significant Turkish communities living in Austria, the UK, Switzerland, Italy, Liechtenstein and the Scandinavian countries. As for Eastern Europe, Professor Oya Dursun-Özkanca said in 2019 that there was over 1 million Turks living in the Balkan countries (i.e. Bosnia and Herzegovina, Bulgaria, Croatia, Greece, Kosovo, Montenegro, North Macedonia, Romania and Serbia); meanwhile, approximately 400,000 Meskhetian Turks live in the European regions of the Post-Soviet states (i.e. Azerbaijan, Georgia, Kazakhstan, Russia and Ukraine). Also, the number of Turkish Cypriots and Turkish settlers living in North Cyprus is around 300,000 to 500,000. 

In addition, in the Republic of Turkey over 10.6 million people were living in the European areas of the country (according to the 2012 census); furthermore, one-fifth of Turkey's entire population, or around 15–20 million Turks, descend from the muhacirs ("refugees") who were forced to leave the Balkans before and after the First World War. Also, the number of Turkish Cypriots in the country may exceed 600,000.

Turkish communities in former Ottoman territories

Turkey

The Republic of Turkey is a transcontinental country with territory in both Europe and Asia. In its literal sense, the European region of the country is located in Eastern Thrace and includes all the territories of the Turkish provinces of Edirne, Tekirdağ and Kırklareli, as well as those territories on the European continent of the provinces of Çanakkale and Istanbul. The land borders of East Thrace were defined by the Treaty of Constantinople (1913) and the Bulgarian-Ottoman convention (1915), and were reaffirmed by the Treaty of Lausanne. According to the 2012 census, there was 10,620,739 people living in Eastern Thrace. 

In addition, due to the formation of modern nation states the 19th and 20th centuries, millions of Turkish communities from the former Ottoman provinces fled persecution and arrived in Turkey as muhacirs ("refugees"). Today, approximately one-fifth of the Turkish population, or around 15–20 million Turks, is estimated to have Balkan origins. Most arrived from Bulgaria, Greece, Romania and Yugoslavia. In addition, there was significant migration waves from the island of Cyprus; today the Turkish Cypriot population in Turkey may exceed 600,000.

Balkans

Bosnia and Herzegovina

The last Bosnian census taken in 2013 recorded 1,108 Turks. The Turkish language is officially recognized as a minority language, in accordance with the European Charter for Regional or Minority Languages, under Article 2, paragraph 2, of the 2010 ratification.

Bulgaria

The last Bulgarian census taken in 2011 recorded 588,318 Turks (i.e. 8.8% of Bulgaria's total population), and showed that they formed a majority in the Kardzhali Province and the Razgrad Province. However, in 2010, an article published by Novinite reported findings from the Center for Demographic Policy and claimed that the Turks numbered 1 million.

The Bulgarian constitution of 1991 does not mention any ethnic minorities and the Bulgarian language is the sole official language of the State. However, in accordance with Article 36(2), the Turkish minority has the right to study their own language alongside the compulsory study of the Bulgarian language. Moreover, under Article 54(1), the Turkish minority have the right to "develop their culture in accordance with his ethnic identification".

Croatia

The last Croatian census taken in 2011 recorded 367 Turks. Although a small community, the Turks are officially recognized as a minority ethnic group, in accordance with the 2010 Constitution of Croatia.

Greece

The last Greek census which allowed citizens to declare their ethnicity was taken in 1951; it recorded 85,945 Turks, which formed 1.2% of Greece's total population. In 1990 Lois Whitman from Human Rights Watch said that the Turks living the Western Thrace region numbered between 120,000 and 130,000 (i.e. between 33 and 36 percent of the population). More recently, in 2011 Dr Hermann Kandler said that the Turkish minority numbered 150,000 (about 50 percent of the population of Greek Thrace). Due to economic reasons, some Western Thrace Turks have migrated to Athens and Thessaloniki. In addition, there is around 5,000 Turks in the Dodecanese islands of Rhodes and Kos.

The Turks of Western Thrace have protected status to practice their religion and use the Turkish language, in accordance with the 1923 Treaty of Lausanne. Since the mid-1950s the Greek government referred to the ethnic rather than the religious character of the minority, until the governor general of Thrace instructed the local authorities to substitute the word "Turkish" for Muslim". However, Dr Hermann Kandler points out that the minority is "essentially based on a Turkish rather than a Muslim historical consciousness" and that this "extends back to the founding of the first of four western Thracian republics in the summer of 1913" which existed for only 55 days. The other sizable Turkish minorities living throughout Greece have no official recognition.

Kosovo

The last Kosovan census taken in 2011 recorded 18,738 Turks, which formed 1.1% of Kosovo's total population. However, the OSCE in 2010 suggest that there was 30,000 Kosovo Turks. The European Centre for Minority Issues Kosovo also said that the 2011 census figures is lower than other estimates.

The Turkish language is recognized as an official language in the municipalities of Prizren and Mamuša and has minority status in Gjilan, Pristina, Vučitrn, and Mitrovica.

Montenegro

The last Montenegrin census taken in 2011 recorded 104 Turks.

North Macedonia

The last Macedonian census taken in 2002 recorded 77,959 Turks, which formed 3.85% of North Macedonia's total population. Yet, in 1996 Fred Abrahams from Human Rights Watch said that, like other ethnic minority groups in the country, leaders of the Turkish community claim higher numbers than the censuses show; for example, Erdogan Saraç of the Democratic Party of Turks had estimated that between 170,000 and 200,000 ethnic Turks were living in the country.

Initially the 1988 draft constitution spoke of the "state of the Macedonian people and the Albanian and Turkish minority". Once the 1991 constitution came into force the Turkish language was used officially where Turks formed a majority in the Centar Župa Municipality and the Plasnica Municipality. Since the 2001 amendment to the constitution, the Turkish language is officially used where Turks form at least 20% of the population and hence it is also an official language of Mavrovo and Rostuša.

Romania
 

The last Romanian census taken in 2011 recorded 28,226 recorded Turks, which formed 0.15% of Romania's total population. However, in 2006, the President of Romania, Traian Băsescu, and  Professor David Phinnemore had estimated that the Turkish minority numbered 55,000. Furthermore, in 2008 Professor Daniela-Luminita Constantin, Professor Zizi Goschin and Professor Mariana Dragusin said that the total Turkish population was 80,000 - including the Turkish minority and recent Turkish immigrants. 

The Turkish language is officially recognized as a minority language, in accordance with the European Charter for Regional or Minority Languages, under Part III of the 2007 ratification.

Today, the only region left with a Turkish majority population is Dobromir, a commune in the Constanța County. Historically, the Turks also formed a majority on the island of Ada Kaleh, which was submerged during the construction of the Iron Gates hydroelectric plant in 1970.

Serbia
 
The last Serbian census undertaken in 2011 recorded 647 Turks.

Cyprus

With the establishment of the Republic of Cyprus in 1960, the Cypriot constitution (Articles 2 and 3) recognized the Turkish Cypriots as one of the "Two Communities" of the republic (alongside the Greek Cypriots). Hence, legally, they were given equal power-sharing rights with the Greek Cypriots and were not defined as a "minority group"; furthermore, the Turkish language was also recognized as an official language of the republic, alongside the Greek language. However, due to the Cyprus crisis of 1963–64, followed by the Greek-led 1974 Cypriot coup d'état (which sought to achieve Enosis and establish the "Hellenic Republic of Cyprus" by ethnically cleansing the Turkish Cypriots under the  Akritas plan also known as "the blueprint to genocide"), and then the 1974 Turkish invasion of Cyprus, the Turkish Cypriots declared their own state – the Turkish Republic of Northern Cyprus (TRNC) – in 1983.

Today Northern Cyprus is populated mostly by Turkish Cypriots and recent Anatolian Turkish settlers. According to the 2011 TRNC census, the population of Northern Cyprus was 286,257. Other estimates suggests that there is between 300,000–500,000 Turkish Cypriots and Turkish settlers living in the north of the island. In addition, there was 1,128 Turkish Cypriots living in the south of the island in the 2011 census.

Hungary

The Turkish people first began to migrate to Hungary during the Ottoman rule of Hungary (1541–1699). A second wave of Ottoman-Turkish migration occurred in the late 19th century when relations between the Ottoman Empire and the Austro-Hungarian Empire improved; most of these immigrants settled in Budapest. In the 2001 Hungarian census, 1,565 people declared their ethnicity as "Ottoman Turkish"; in addition, 12 individuals declared to be "Turk" and 91 "Bulgarian-Turkish".

Modern Turkish diasporas outside former Ottoman territories

Central and Western Europe
The Turks form substantial communities in "Western Europe" which includes countries with their borders strictly in Western Europe 
(i.e. Belgium, France, Ireland, the Netherlands and the United Kingdom) as well as countries with territory in both Western and Central Europe (i.e. Austria, Germany, Liechtenstein and Switzerland).

Austria

The Turkish community, including descendants, form the largest ethnic minority in Austria. In 2011 a report by the Initiative Minderheiten said that there was 360,000 people of Turkish origin living in Austria. This figure has also been echoed by the former Austrian Foreign Minister and current Chancellor of Austria Sebastian Kurz. By 2010 Ariel Muzicant said that the Turks in Austria already numbered 400,000. Another estimate by the former Austrian MEP, Andreas Mölzer, has claimed that there are 500,000 Turks in the country. Most of the Austrian-Turkish community descend from Turkey, however, there are also Turkish communities which have migrated to Austria from Bulgaria and Greece.

Belgium

In 2012 Professor Raymond Taras said that the Belgian-Turkish community was over 200,000. More recently, in 2019 Dr Altay Manço and Dr Ertugrul Taş said that there was 250,000 Belgian residents of Turkish origin.

France

The Turks living in France are one of the largest Turkish communities in Western Europe. Official data on the total number of French Turks is not available because the French census only records statistics on the country of birth rather than one's ethnic affiliation. 

Although the majority of French Turks descend from the Republic of Turkey, there has also been significant Turkish migration from other post-Ottoman countries including ethnic Turkish communities which have come to France from North Africa (especially Algeria and Tunisia), the Balkans (e.g. from Bulgaria, Greece, Kosovo, North Macedonia and Romania), the island of Cyprus, and more recently from Iraq, Lebanon, and Syria. 

In 2014 Professor Pierre Vermeren reported in L'Express that the Turkish population was around 800,000. However, an earlier academic publication in 2010 by Dr Jean-Gustave Hentz and Dr Michel Hasselmann said that there was already 1 million Turks living in France. Professor İzzet Er, as well as the French-Armenian politician Garo Yalic (who is an advisor to Valerie Boyer), also said that there was 1,000,000 Turks in France in 2011 and 2012 respectively. More recently, the Franco-Turkish population has been estimated to be more than one million according to French-published articles in Le Petit Journal (2019) and Marianne (2020).

Germany

The Turkish-Germans are the largest ethnic minority group in Germany and also the largest Turkish community in the Turkish diaspora. 

The German census only collects data on country of birth, rather than ethnicity, consequently, official figures do not provide a true representation of the total population (i.e. including German-born descendants of full or partial Turkish origin regardless of country of birth). The majority of ethnic Turks living in Germany have either arrived from or originate from Turkey; however, there are also significant ethnic Turkish communities which have come from (or descend from) post-Ottoman nation-states in the Balkans (especially from Bulgaria and Greece), as well as from the island of Cyprus, and Lebanon. More recently, since the European migrant crisis (2014–19), there has also been a significant increase in the number of ethnic Turks from Syria, Iraq and Kosovo who have come to Germany. 

In 1997 the Chancellor of Germany, Helmut Kohl, said that there was 3 million Turks in Germany. However, since the early 2000s, numerous academics have said that there is "at least" or "more than" 4 million people of Turkish origin living in Germany (forming approximately 5% of the country's population). Numerous sources have suggested significantly higher estimates. As early as 2005 Austrian scholar Dr. Tessa Szyszkowitz quoted a senior European official who said: 

By 2013 Dr James Lacey and Professor Williamson Murray noted that the German chancellor, Angela Merkel, said that Germany's Leitkultur "needs to be accepted by Germany's seven million Turkish immigrants". 

As of 2020, numerous sources have said that there are 7 million, or more than 7 million, Turks in Germany, including Professor George K. Zestos and Rachel Cooke in their report published by the Levy Economics Institute, Professor Graham E. Fuller's article in the Quincy Institute for Responsible Statecraft, Professor James G. Lacey's article in the National Security Innovation Network. and Louise Callaghan's article in The Times.

Ireland

Liechtenstein

Liechtenstein does not record data on the ethnicity of its citizens; however, in 2009, the Turkish community was estimated to number approximately 1,000 out of a total population of 35,000. Hence, estimates suggest that the Turks form around 3% of Liechtenstein's total population and that they are the fifth largest ethnic group in the country.

Netherlands

The Turkish-Dutch community form the largest ethnic minority group in the Netherlands. The majority of Dutch Turks descend from the Republic of Turkey; however there has also been significant Turkish migration waves from other post-Ottoman countries including ethnic Turkish communities which have come to the Netherlands from the Balkans (e.g. especially from Bulgaria, Greece, and North Macedonia), the island of Cyprus, and more recently during the European migrant crisis from Syria, Iraq and Kosovo. In addition, there has been migration to the Netherlands from the Turkish diaspora; many Turkish-Belgians and Turkish-Germans have arrived in the country as Belgian and German citizens. 

The Dutch official census only collects data on country of birth, rather than ethnically; consequently, the total number of ethnic Turkish migrants (regardless of country of birth) nor the third, fourth or fifth generation of the Turkish-Dutch community have been collectively counted. Assistant Professor Suzanne Aalberse, Professor Ad Backus and Professor Pieter Muysken have said that "over the years" the Dutch-Turkish community "must have numbered half a million". However, there are significantly higher estimates. As early as 2003, the political scientist and international relations expert Nathalie Tocci said that there was already "two million Turks in Holland". Rita van Veen also reported in Trouw that there was 2 million Turks in the Netherlands in 2007.

In 2009 The Sophia Echo reported that Bulgarian Turks were now the fastest-growing group of immigrants in the Netherlands.

Poland

In 2013 data from the Institute of Public Affairs showed that there were 5,000 Turks living in Poland.

Slovenia
The last Slovenian census taken in 2002 recorded 359 Turks.

Switzerland

In 2017 there was over 120,000 Turks living in Switzerland. They mostly live in German-speaking regions, especially in the cantons of Zurich, Aargau and Basel. Figures on naturalization and migration from Turkey has been declining, however, the Swiss population with a Turkish migration background continues to grow.

United Kingdom

In 2011 the Home Affairs Committee stated here was 500,000 British Turks made up of 300,000 Turkish Cypriots, 150,000 Turkish nationals (i.e. people from Turkey), and smaller groups of Bulgarian Turks and Romanian Turks. In addition, there are growing Turkish communities in the UK which have arrived from Algeria, Bulgaria, Greece (i.e. Western Thrace region), Iraq and Syria.

Northern Europe

Denmark

The Turkish community form the largest ethnic minority in Denmark. In 2008 the Danish Broadcasting Corporation estimated that Danes of Turkish origin numbered 70,000. Whilst the majority of Danish Turks originate from Turkey, there is also a Turkish community from Iraq living in the country.

Finland

In 2010 Professor Zeki Kütük said that there was approximately 10,000 people of Turkish origin living in Finland.

Norway

In 2013 there was roughly 16,500 Norwegians of Turkish descent living in Norway.

Sweden

In 2009 the Swedish Ministry for Foreign Affairs said that there was almost 100,000 people with a Turkish background living in Sweden. More recently, in 2018 the Swedish Consul General, Therese Hyden, said that the population was now around 150,000.

Although the majority of Swedish Turks originate from the modern borders of Turkey, there has also been substantial Turkish migration waves from Bulgaria (which numbered approximately 30,000 in 2002); furthermore, there is a substantial number of Macedonian Turks with approximately 4,5000 from Prespa region living in Malmö. Turks have also arrived from Iraq and Syria, especially since the European migrant crisis.

Southern Europe

Italy

In 2020 there was 50,000 Turkish citizens living in Italy; however, this figure does not include naturalized Italian citizens of Turkish origin or their descendants. In addition to the diaspora, some of the population in Moena has identified as Turkish since the 17th century.

Spain

The Turkish community in Spain has been  increasing significantly since the 2000s. In 2015 there was approximately 10,000 Turkish citizens living in the country, especially in Madrid and Barcelona; however, this figure does not include naturalized Spain citizens of Turkish origin or their descendants.

Eastern Europe

The majority of Turks living in Eastern Europe are from the Turkish Meskhetian minority with were deported from Meskhetia in Georgia in 1944.

Religion

Notable Ottoman-Turkish Mosques in the Balkans

Notable Ottoman-Turkish Mosques in Cyprus

Notable Turkish Mosques in Western Europe

Politics

List of Turkish founded political parties
Various political parties have been formed by Turkish communities in the Balkans and Cyprus as well as in the Turkish diaspora.

See also 
 Turkish minorities in the former Ottoman Empire
 Turquerie
 Turkish population
 Accession of Turkey to the European Union 
 Turkey–European Union relations
 Demographics of Europe
 European Turkey
 Immigration to Europe

Notes

References

Ethnic groups in Europe
Muslim communities in Europe
Turkish communities outside Turkey